Richard Davis is a professor and author. He is a professor emeritus at Brigham Young University. He is the author of several books and articles in American politics, including Web of Politics, Electing Justice, Supreme Democracy, and Campaigning Online.

Biography
Davis graduated from Brigham Young University with a B.A. in Political Science and then completed a Master's in Mass Communication from BYU as well. He went on to Syracuse University where he earned another Master's and his Ph.D., both in political science. 

He was the founding director of the Office of Civic Engagement Leadership at Brigham Young University. He co-founded the Civic Engagement Section of the American Political Science Association. He also was a co-founder of the Utah Debate Commission. He also co-founded the United Utah Party, a centrist state party in Utah.

Works 
 Electoral Campaigns, Media, and the New World of Digital Politics (Ann Arbor, MI: University of Michigan Press, 2022) Edited volume with David Taras
 Beyond Donkeys and Elephants: Minor Political Parties in Contemporary American Politics, (Lawrence, KS: University of Kansas Press, 2020) Edited Volume
 Power Shift? Political Leadership and Social Media (New York: Routledge, 2020) Edited volume with David Taras
 Supreme Democracy: The End of Elitism in Supreme Court Nominations (New York: Oxford University Press, 2017)
 Justices and Journalists: The Global Perspective (New York: Cambridge University Press, 2017) Edited volume with David Taras
 Twitter and Elections around the World (New York: Routledge, 2017) Edited volume with Christina Holtz-Bacha and Marion Just.
 Covering the Court in the Digital Age (New York: Cambridge University Press, 2014) Edited volume.
 Justices and Journalists (New York: Cambridge University Press, 2011)
 Typing Politics (New York: Oxford University Press, 2009)
 Making a Difference: A Comparative View of the Role of the Internet in Election Politics (Lanham, MD: Lexington Books, 2008) Edited volume with Diana Owen, Stephen Ward, and David Taras
 Electing Justice (New York: Oxford University Press, 2005)
 Campaigning Online (New York: Oxford University Press, 2003) With Bruce Bimber
 The Press and American Politics: The New Mediator (Englewood Cliffs, NJ: Prentice-Hall, 2000)
 The Web of Politics(New York: Oxford University Press, 1999)
 New Media and American Politics (New York: Oxford University Press, 1998) With Diana Owen
 Decisions and Images (Englewood Cliffs, NJ: Prentice-Hall, 1994)
 Politics and the Media (Englewood Cliffs, NJ: Prentice-Hall, 1994) Edited Volume
Trade Books
 Spiritual Gems from the Imitation of Christ, (Totowa, NJ: Catholic Book Publishing, 2016)
 The Liberal Soul: Applying the Gospel of Jesus Christ to Politics (Sandy, UT: Greg Kofford Books, 2014)
 Fathers and Sons: Lessons from the Scriptures (Springville, UT: Cedar Fort Publishing, 2005)

References

20th-century American male writers
20th-century American non-fiction writers
21st-century American male writers
21st-century American non-fiction writers
American political scientists
Brigham Young University alumni
Brigham Young University faculty
Date of birth missing (living people)
Living people
Syracuse University alumni